KHYG-FM is a Variety formatted broadcast radio station licensed to and serving Hydaburg, Alaska.  KHYG-FM is owned and operated by Hydaburg City School District.

References

External links
 

2016 establishments in Alaska
Variety radio stations in the United States
Radio stations established in 2016
HYG-FM